Edgar Hughes Degenaart Russell (24 October 1890 – 31 March 1963) was an Australian politician.

Russell was born at Booleroo Centre. He was educated at public schools at Booleroo Centre and Port Germein. His family subsequently moved to Port Pirie; his father, C. A. Degenhardt, was a four-time mayor of the Town of Port Pirie. He was a bank clerk and manager for the National Bank of Australia for twelve years in various towns before becoming a private accountant; he was also a certified local government auditor. He was reportedly compelled to change his surname from Degenhardt to Russell by the bank.

In 1943, he was elected to the Australian House of Representatives as the Labor member for Grey, defeating sitting United Australia Party member Oliver Badman. A long-term delegate to party conferences, he had defeated Australian Workers' Union nominee Charles Davis for Labor preselection. Though described himself as a moderate, he won with the support of more militant unions. Russell held the seat until his death in 1963.

References

Australian Labor Party members of the Parliament of Australia
Members of the Australian House of Representatives for Grey
Members of the Australian House of Representatives
1890 births
1963 deaths
20th-century Australian politicians